The Australia Prize was Australia's pre-eminent prize for scientific research from 1990 until 2000, when it was replaced by the Prime Minister's Prizes for Science. The award was international, 10 of the 28 recipients were not Australians.

Recipients

1999 - Energy science and technology theme - Martin A. Green and Stuart R. Wenham
1998 - Molecular science theme - Elizabeth Blackburn, Suzanne Cory, Alec Jeffreys and Grant Sutherland
1997 - Telecommunications theme- Allan Snyder, Rodney Tucker and Gottfried Ungerboeck
1996 - Pharmaceutical design theme - Paul Janssen, Graeme Laver, Peter Colman and Mark von Itzstein 
1995 - Remote sensing theme - Kenneth G. McCracken, Andrew Green, Jonathon Huntington, Richard Moore 
1994 - Sustainable land management theme - Gene Likens 
1993 - Sensory perception theme - Horace Barlow, Peter Bishop and Vernon Mountcastle 
1992 - Mining or processing of mineral resources theme - John Watt, Brian Sowerby, Nicholas Cutmore and Jim Howarth
1991 - No awards presented 
1990 - Agriculture or the environment theme - Allen Kerr, Eugene Nester and Jeff Schell

References
 Australia Prize 1990-1999, Prime Minister's Prizes for Science

Australian science and technology awards
History of science and technology in Australia